Sneh Rana (born 18 February 1994) is an Indian cricketer, who currently plays for Railways and India as a right-arm off break bowler and right-handed batter.

Early life and background 
Rana hails from Sinaula, on the outskirts of Dehradun. Her father was a farmer.

International career
She made her Women's One Day International and Women's Twenty20 International debuts against Sri Lanka in 2014.

After a knee injury in 2016, she was side-lined from the national team, and would not play international cricket for another five years. During this period, she played domestic cricket, and also played for India B.

In May 2021, she was named in India's Test squad for their one-off match against the England women's cricket team. Rana made her Test debut on 16 June 2021, for India against England.

In January 2022, she was named in India's team for the 2022 Women's Cricket World Cup in New Zealand. In July 2022, she was named in India's team for the cricket tournament at the 2022 Commonwealth Games in Birmingham, England.

References

External links
 
 
 Sneh Rana at The Cricket Fanatic

1984 births
Living people
Indian women cricketers
Sportspeople from Dehradun
India women Test cricketers
India women One Day International cricketers
India women Twenty20 International cricketers
Punjab, India women cricketers
Railways women cricketers
IPL Velocity cricketers
Gujarat Giants (WPL) cricketers
Sportswomen from Uttarakhand
Cricketers from Uttarakhand
Cricketers at the 2022 Commonwealth Games
Commonwealth Games silver medallists for India
Commonwealth Games medallists in cricket
Medallists at the 2022 Commonwealth Games